Conospermum coerulescens is a shrub endemic to Western Australia.

It blooms between July and February producing blue flowers. The leaves are filiform to narrow lanceolate in shape.

It is found on sand plains and low hills in the Great Southern regions of Western Australia between Albany and the Fitzgerald River National Park where it grows in sandy to loamy soils often over gravelly laterite.

There are three known subspecies:
 Conospermum coerulescens subsp. adpressum
 Conospermum coerulescens subsp. coerulescens
 Conospermum coerulescens subsp. dorrienii

References

External links

Eudicots of Western Australia
coerulescens
Endemic flora of Western Australia
Plants described in 1859
Taxa named by Ferdinand von Mueller